31st National Board of Review Awards
Late December, 1959
The 31st National Board of Review Awards were announced in late December, 1959.

Top Ten Films 
The Nun's Story
Ben-Hur
Anatomy of a Murder
The Diary of Anne Frank
Middle of the Night
The Man Who Understood Women
Some Like It Hot
Suddenly, Last Summer
On the Beach
North by Northwest

Top Foreign Films 
Wild Strawberries
Room at the Top
Aparajito
The Roof
Look Back in Anger

Winners 
Best Film: The Nun's Story
Best Foreign Film: Wild Strawberries
Best Actor: Victor Sjöström (Wild Strawberries)
Best Actress: Simone Signoret (Room at the Top)
Best Supporting Actor: Hugh Griffith (Ben-Hur)
Best Supporting Actress: Edith Evans (The Nun's Story)
Best Director: Fred Zinnemann (The Nun's Story)
Special Citation: Ingmar Bergman; Andrew Marton, Yakima Canutt (Ben-Hur, for directing the chariot race)

External links 
National Board of Review of Motion Pictures :: Awards for 1959

1959
National Board of Review Awards
National Board of Review Awards
National Board of Review Awards
National Board of Review Awards